Brendan Murphy  (born 1955) is an Australian public servant, health executive and nephrologist who served as the Chief Medical Officer (CMO) of Australia from 4 October 2016 before beginning as the Secretary of the Department of Health on 13 July 2020.

Biography
Murphy was born in 1955 and educated at Preshil, Melbourne Grammar School and Trinity College within the University of Melbourne. He married lawyer and university administrator Sally Walker in 1979 and has two sons.

Murphy was a nephrologist by profession and was formerly president of the Australian and New Zealand Society of Nephrology; CMO and director of nephrology at St Vincent's Health; CEO of Austin Health; and a board member of Health Workforce Australia, the Florey Institute of Neuroscience and Mental Health, the Olivia Newton-John Cancer Research Institute, and the Victorian Comprehensive Cancer Centre. Murphy is the first medical doctor to be appointed the public servant position of Secretary of the Department of Health in its current incarnation, and since Dr Gwynne Howells, who was Secretary to the former Department of Health until 1982.

Chief Medical Officer

Murphy was appointed CMO of Australia on 4 October 2016, when he replaced Chris Baggoley. He became "the public face of Australia's fight against COVID-19" during the COVID-19 pandemic in Australia, giving regular press conferences with the Prime Minister, Scott Morrison, and Health Minister Greg Hunt.

Murphy was also head of the Australian Health Protection Principal Committee and in that role an adviser to the National Cabinet of Australia created to respond to the pandemic.

He vacated the role of CMO on 29 June 2020, and became the Secretary of the Department of Health on 13 July 2020, an appointment initially announced in January 2020, but delayed due to his central role in the response to the Coronavirus pandemic. His deputy, Paul Kelly, is acting the role of CMO until a new appointment is made.

Recognition
On 2 November 2020 Murphy was named Australian Capital Territory's Australian of the Year.

In June 2022, Murphy was appointed Companion of the Order of Australia in the 2022 Queen's Birthday Honours for "eminent service to medical administration and community health, particularly as Chief Medical Officer, and to nephrology, to research and innovation, and to professional organisations".

References

1955 births
Australian health officials
Australian nephrologists
Companions of the Order of Australia
21st-century Australian medical doctors
21st-century Australian public servants
Living people
Secretaries of Australian Government departments
People educated at Trinity College (University of Melbourne)
University of Melbourne alumni
Public servants from Melbourne
Medical doctors from Melbourne